Molde University College - Specialized University in Logistics (abbreviated HiM) is a Norwegian specialized university.  It is located in the town of Molde in Molde Municipality, Møre og Romsdal county, Norway.  The university offers higher education in business administration, logistics, information technology, and health sciences.

Degrees are offered both at Bachelor, Master of Science, and PhD level. The institution belonged to the university colleges until 1 January 2010, when it received its new status as a specialized university in logistics. It is one of nine specialized universities in the Norwegian higher education system. The main campus is in Molde, but some study programs are offered in Kristiansund. Møre Research Institute is also located on campus.

Study programs
Bachelor programs:
 Social Studies
 Business Administration
 Logistics
 Sports Management
 Information Technology
 Health Sciences

Master programs:
 MSc in Logistics
 MSc in Engineering Logistics
 MSc in Petroleum Logistics
 MSc in Event Management
 MSc in Team Sport Management
 MSc in Business Administration
PhD programs:
 PhD in Logistics
 PhD in Health Sciences

References

Universities and colleges in Norway
Education in Møre og Romsdal
Molde
Kristiansund
Educational institutions established in 1994
Organisations based in Molde
1994 establishments in Norway